"How Bizarre" is a song written and performed by New Zealand musical group OMC. It was released in December 1995 as the lead single from their only album of the same name and went on to top the charts of five countries: Australia, Austria, Canada, Ireland, and New Zealand. Outside New Zealand, OMC is generally considered a one-hit wonder; they had a further few successful singles in New Zealand, including "On the Run" and "Land of Plenty".

Critical reception
The song won the award for "Single of the Year" at the 1996 New Zealand Music Awards. It was also featured on Nature's Best 2, as the 34th greatest New Zealand song of all time as voted for by members of the Australasian Performing Right Association in 2001. In 2002, the song was named as the 71st greatest one-hit wonder of all time on a VH1 countdown hosted by William Shatner.

Ross Jones from The Guardian called the song "supernaturally summery", noting that it "combines a proto-electro beat, a funky Mariachi guitar, Tex-Mex trumpets, girly close harmonies, and a goofy rap". Pan-European magazine Music & Media wrote, "Polynesian pop with a twist. Pauly Fuemana has a gravelly, deep voice and a major rap attitude. The Spanish guitar, trumpet and the sweet female background vocals create a radio friendly mood. This single from the forthcoming album Time Is Money smashed New Zealand and Australian sales figures; OMC's quirky catchiness should kick up some dust in Europe too." British trade paper Music Week rated it four out of five, adding, "A smash in Australia and NZ, this mix of male vocals with Spanish guitar and a samba/dance beat could be a surprise hit if radio latches on."

Chart performance
"How Bizarre" topped the singles charts in New Zealand, Australia, Austria, Canada and Ireland. As the track was only released to radio in the United States, with no commercial single made available to buy, the song was not allowed to chart on the Billboard Hot 100 under the chart rules in place at the time. However, it topped the Mainstream Top 40 for a week, then called the Pop Singles. It also peaked at number four on the Billboard Hot 100 Airplay chart. The single was number one for one week in Canada, two weeks in Austria, three weeks in Ireland, three weeks in New Zealand and five weeks in Australia. On 9 February 2010, the song re-entered the New Zealand charts at number 40 after Fuemana's death.

Music video
A music video was released to help promote the single. The video has lead singer Pauly Fuemana driving a 1968 Chevrolet Impala. It also pictures him dancing, rapping, throwing around money and breathing fire. The video was directed by Lee Baker and was released very late in 1995, just before "How Bizarre" went to number one in New Zealand. Shot on a soundstage in Ponsonby and at Ellerslie Racecourse for a budget of $7,000 from NZ On Air, it was shown on US networks about 15,000 times in 1997 and 1998. Besides Pauly, it features backing vocalist Sina Saipaia, and a Filipino man named Hill who stood in for Brother Pele.

Track listings

Australasian and European CD single
 "How Bizarre" (radio mix) – 3:49
 "How Bizarre" (album mix) – 3:49
 "How Bizarre" (instrumental) – 3:49
 "How Bizarre" (dance mix) – 6:00

Australasian cassette single
 "How Bizarre" (radio mix)
 "How Bizarre" (album mix)
 "How Bizarre" (instrumental)

UK 12-inch single
A. "How Bizarre" (Sharp Raided mix) – 7:50
B. "How Bizarre" (Flexifinger "In My Face" mix) – 8:18

European CD single—cardboard sleeve
 "How Bizarre" (radio mix) – 3:49
 "How Bizarre" (dance mix) – 6:00

US promo CD
 "How Bizarre" – 3:43

Japanese CD single
 "How Bizarre" (radio mix)
 "How Bizarre" (album mix)
 "How Bizarre" (instrumental)
 "How Bizarre" (dance mix)
 "How Bizarre" (acoustic mix)

Charts

Weekly charts

Year-end charts

Certifications

Release history

Covers and parodies
In 1996, a radio personality named Dean Young created a cover of the song called "Stole My Car". Dean was working with RNZ-owned Rock 99 formerly based in Rotorua on 99.1 FM. In 2003, the radio stadion ZM and Iain Stables released a compilation album of some of the parodies that were created in the radio company called Stables Label Volume 3. The album name was a parody itself as there was no Volume 1 or 2. The song "Stole My Car" was the eighth track on the album.

In popular culture
The song became the anthem of the English 1997 FA Women's Cup Final-winning Millwall Lionesses soccer team. "How Bizarre" was included in the 1998 movies Palmetto and Disney's The Parent Trap and plays at the start of the first episode of the second season of American sitcom Clueless. It is also used in the third season episode "Coming Home" of the American alternate history television series For All Mankind (TV series).

The music video for New Zealand band Six60's "All She Wrote" (2021) was shot as a tribute to "How Bizarre".

Recent popularity
In the months leading up to March 2021, there was a resurgence of the song's popularity secondary to its adoption by many users of TikTok. Over 100,000 videos have incorporated the song's lyrics in videos showing awkward conversations and strange coincidences. The #HowBizarre hashtag has generated more than 1.4 billion views.

References

1995 singles
1995 songs
1996 singles
APRA Award winners
Irish Singles Chart number-one singles
Mercury Records singles
Number-one singles in Australia
Number-one singles in Austria
Number-one singles in New Zealand
OMC (band) songs
Polydor Records singles
RPM Top Singles number-one singles